The SAS Institute, creators of the SAS System filed a lawsuit against World Programming Limited, creators of World Programming System (WPS) in November 2009. The dispute was whether World Programming had infringed copyrights on SAS Institute Products and Manuals, and whether World Programming used SAS Learning Edition to reverse engineer SAS system in violation with its term of usage.

The case is interesting because World Programming did not have access to the SAS Institute's source code, and so the court considered the merits of a copyright claim based on observing functionality only. The European Committee for Interoperable Systems say that the case is important to the software industry. Some observers say the case is as important as the Borland versus Lotus case.

The EU Court of Justice ruled that copyright protection does not extend to the software functionality, the programming language used and the format of the data files used by the program. It stated that there is no copyright infringement when a company which does not have access to the source code of a program studies, observes and tests that program to create another program with the same functionality.

High Court of England and Wales 
On 23 July 2010 Mr Justice Arnold in the High Court of England and Wales referred a number of questions to the Court of Justice of the European Union (CJEU), but expressed his initial views of the main claims via the following observations in the initial judgment ([2010] EWHC 1829 (Ch, [2011] RPC 1).

1.	On his preferred interpretation of Article 5(3), WPL's use of the Learning Edition is within Article 5(3), and to the extent that the licence terms prevent this they are null and void, with the result that none of WPL's acts complained of was a breach of contract or an infringement of copyright except perhaps one (see paragraphs 313-315 of the initial judgment).

2	WPL has infringed the copyrights in the SAS Manuals by substantially reproducing them in the WPL Manual (see paragraphs 317-319 of the initial judgment).

3	WPL has not infringed the copyrights in the SAS Manuals by producing the WPS Guides (see paragraphs 320-329 of the initial judgment).

4	On the assumption that Mr Justice Pumfrey's interpretation of Article 1(2) of the Software Directive (from Navitaire v Easyjet [2004]) was correct, WPL has not infringed SAS Institute's copyrights in the SAS Components by producing WPS (see paragraphs 245-250 of the initial judgment).

Mr Justice Arnold quoted (at paragraph 56) from the "SAS language" article of Wikipedia (as at 25 April 2010) in support of his view that SAS is a "programming language" (and thus not protected under the Software Directive):
"SAS can be considered a general programming language, though it serves largely as a database programming language and a language with a wide variety of specialized analytic and graphic procedures."

First, the decision confirms what WPL has always admitted, namely that it has used the SAS Manuals to emulate functionality of the SAS System in WPS. Secondly, it shows that to some extent WPL has reproduced aspects of the SAS Manuals going beyond that which was strictly necessary in order for WPS to emulate the functions of the SAS System. What it does not show is reproduction of the SAS source code by WPS going beyond the reproduction of its functionality. WPL's manual writers did not directly copy from the SAS Manuals in the sense of having one of the SAS Manuals open in front of them when writing the WPS Manual and intentionally either transcribing or paraphrasing the wording. A considerable degree of similarity in both content and language between the SAS Manual entries and the WPS Manual entries is to be expected given that they are describing identical functionality. The degree of resemblance in the language goes beyond that which is attributable to describing identical functionality.

Mr Justice Arnold referred certain questions to the CJEU. After the CJEU handed down its decision later in 2012, Mr Justice Arnold in the High Court handed down his final judgment on 25 January 2013, which concluded (as summarised in the final statement of the judgment):

"82. For the reasons given above, I dismiss all of SAS Institute's claims except for its claim in respect of the WPS Manual. That claim succeeds to the extent indicated in my first judgment, but no further."

Court of Justice of the European Union reference 
The High Court referred several questions of the interpretation of the Computer Programs Directive and the Information Society Directive to the Court of Justice of the European Union, under the preliminary ruling procedure. Advocate-General Yves Bot gave his Opinion on 29 November 2011. The full judgment was handed down by the European Court of Justice on 2 May 2012. It largely adopted the Advocate-General's Opinion, holding that neither the functionality of a computer program nor the programming language and the format of data files used in a computer program in order to exploit certain of its functions are covered by copyright.

The Court concluded that:

1.      Article 1(2) of the Computer Programs Directive (Council Directive 91/250/EEC of 14 May 1991) must be interpreted as meaning that neither the functionality of a computer program nor the programming language and the format of data files used in a computer program in order to exploit certain of its functions constitute a form of expression of that program and, as such, are not protected by copyright in computer programs for the purposes of that directive.

2.      Article 5(3) of the Computer Programs Directive must be interpreted as meaning that a person who has obtained a copy of a computer program under a licence is entitled, without the authorisation of the owner of the copyright, to observe, study or test the functioning of that program so as to determine the ideas and principles which underlie any element of the program, in the case where that person carries out acts covered by that licence and acts of loading and running necessary for the use of the computer program, and on condition that that person does not infringe the exclusive rights of the owner of the copyright in that program.

3.      Article 2(a) of the Information Society Directive (Directive 2001/29/EC of the European Parliament and of the Council of 22 May 2001) must be interpreted as meaning that the reproduction, in a computer program or a user manual for that program, of certain elements described in the user manual for another computer program protected by copyright is capable of constituting an infringement of the copyright in the latter manual if – this being a matter for the national court to ascertain – that reproduction constitutes the expression of the intellectual creation of the author of the user manual for the computer program protected by copyright.

The case returned to the High Court of England and Wales which provided its final judgment on 25 January 2013 applying the CJEU findings to the particular facts of this case.

US lawsuit (initial filing)
The initial US case filed by SAS Institute against WPS was dismissed

SAS INSTITUTE INC., Plaintiff, v. WORLD PROGRAMMING LIMITED, Defendant.

In their briefing, the parties have raised for the court’s consideration a variety of interesting and complex questions of law. But after considering the able arguments of counsel for both sides, the court is unable to conclude that it clearly erred in dismissing this action on for forum non conveniens. As such, and for the reasons set forth more particularly above, plaintiff’s motion to alter or amend judgment pursuant to Rule 59(e) (DE # 53) is DENIED.

SO ORDERED, this the 22nd day of June, 2011.

US lawsuit (subsequent filing) 

A subsequent US case filed by SAS Institute against WPL was won by SAS. After a three-week trial that ended on October 9, 2015, a jury in federal court awarded SAS $79.1 million in damages, after trebling. The jury ruled that WPL had engaged in unfair and deceptive trade practices - specifically, that it had misrepresented its intentions in order to obtain the license to the software, and violated the contract granted, which only allowed for non-commercial use - and that it had infringed on the copyright of its manual by copying portions of it into its own manual. However, Judge Flanagan ruled against SAS in summary judgement that WPL had infringed on the copyright of SAS's software. WPL has announced its intention to appeal.

Implications
The UK case limited the aspects of computer programs which were eligible for copyright protection, and was subsequently cited in the case of Oracle Corporation's lawsuit against Google over the latter's use of Java in Android.

References

External links 
 The Final High Court Judgment
 The Initial High Court Judgment
 The ECJ Judgment

Copyright case law
United Kingdom copyright case law
Copyright infringement of software